Asterophrys is a genus of microhylid frogs found in New Guinea. Their common name is New Guinea bush frogs, although this name may also specifically refer to Asterophrys turpicola.

A distinctive feature of these frogs is their extremely broad head, almost half of snout–vent length. While both are New Guinean species, A. leucopus is more a mountain species than A. turpicola. The latter is known for its aggressiveness (it may even bite), whereas A. leucopus is more docile.

Species
The following species are recognised in the genus Asterophrys:

A third, undescribed species may exist in Papua, western New Guinea.

References

 
Microhylidae
Amphibians of New Guinea
Amphibian genera
Taxa named by Johann Jakob von Tschudi